The Radvanje District is a city district of the City Municipality of Maribor in northeastern Slovenia. The district has a population of about 8,000.

Name
The name Radvanje was attested in historical sources as Radewan in 1096–1105, Radvan in 1220–1230, and Radoan in 1282, among other spellings. It is an elliptical derivation from *Ra̋dovan′e (selȍ) 'Radovanъ's (village)', referring to an early inhabitant of the place.

References

Districts of the City Municipality of Maribor